North Midlands (South) 1 (formerly North Midlands 1) was a tier 9 English Rugby Union league with teams from Birmingham, Herefordshire, Shropshire and Worcestershire taking part.  Promoted teams moved up to Midlands 4 West (South) and relegated teams dropped to North Midlands (South) 2 (formerly North Midlands 2).   

From its inception in 1987 through to 2004 the league had been known as North Midlands 1.  Ahead of the 2004–05 season restructuring saw the league split into two regional divisions - North Midlands (North) and North Midlands (South) 1.  The northern section was cancelled after just one season and the majority of teams transferred into the new Midlands 5 West (North).  At the end of the 2005–06 season the southern section (and North Midlands leagues) were cancelled for good, and the teams transferred into a variety of divisions based on final table standings, including Midlands 5 (West North), Midlands 5 West (South), Midlands 6 West (North) and Midlands 6 West (South-West).

Original teams

When league rugby began in 1987 this division contained the following teams:

Bridgnorth
Camp Hill
Edwardians
Erdington
Kidderminster Carolians
Kings Norton
Luctonians
Newport (Salop)
Old Halesonians
Old Yardleians
Whitchurch

North Midlands 1 honours

North Midlands 1 (1987–1992)

The original North Midlands 1 was a tier 7 league involving clubs from Birmingham and the West Midlands.  Promotion was to Midlands 2 West and relegation to North Midlands 2.

North Midlands 1 (1992–1993)

Restructuring of the Midlands leagues saw North Midlands 1 drop two levels to become a tier 9 league.  Promotion was to the newly introduced Midlands West 2, while relegation continued to North Midlands 2.

North Midlands 1 (1993–1996)

The top six teams from Midlands 1 and the top six from North 1 were combined to create National 5 North, meaning that North Midlands 1 dropped another level to become a tier 10 league.  Promotion continued to Midlands West 2 and relegation to North Midlands 2.

North Midlands 1 (1996–2000)

At the end of the 1995–96 season National 5 North was discontinued and North Midlands 1 returned to being a tier 9 league.  Promotion continued to Midlands West 2 and relegation to North Midlands 2.

North Midlands 1 (2000–2004)

Despite widespread Midlands league restructuring ahead of the 2000–01 season, North Midlands 1 remained at tier 9.  Promotion was now to the newly introduced Midlands 4 West (South) while relegation continued to North Midlands 2.

North Midlands (North / South) 1 (2004–2005)

Ahead of the 2004–05 campaign North Midlands 1 was divided into two regional tier 9 divisions: North Midlands (North) and North Midlands (South) 1.  Promotion was to either Midlands 4 West (North) or Midlands 4 West (South), while relegation only applied to North Midlands (South) 1 with teams dropping to North Midlands (South) 2.  North Midlands (North) was cancelled at the end of the campaign and the majority of teams transferred into the newly introduced Midlands 5 West (North).

North Midlands (South) 1 (2005–2006)

North Midlands (South) 1 continued as a solitary tier 9 league following the cancellation of North Midlands (North).  Promotion was to Midlands 4 West (South) and relegation to North Midlands (South) 2.  At the end of the 2005–06 season North Midlands (South) 1 was cancelled and the majority of teams transferred to the newly introduced Midlands 5 West (North) and Midlands 5 West (South) divisions.

Number of league titles

Evesham (2)
Old Yardleians (2)
Birmingham City Officials (1)
Bridgnorth (1)
Camp Hill (1)
Droitwich (1)
Edwardians (1)
Harborne (1)
Kidderminster Carolians (1)
Ledbury (1)
Luctonians (1)
Malvern (1)
Newport (Salop) (1)
Solihull (1)
Stourbridge Lions (1)
Veseyans (1)
Whitchurch (1)
Worcester (1)

Notes

See also
North Midlands 2
North Midlands 3
North Midlands 4
Midlands RFU
North Midlands RFU
English rugby union system
Rugby union in England

References

External links
 North Midlands RFU website

9
Rugby union in Herefordshire
Rugby union in Shropshire
Rugby union in Worcestershire
Sport in Birmingham, West Midlands
Sports leagues established in 1987
Sports leagues disestablished in 2006